Geoff Curtis (26 April 1943 – 15 December 1973) was a speedway rider from Australia.

Speedway career 
Curtis rode in the top tier of British Speedway from 1969 to 1973, riding for various clubs. He was a finalist at the British Speedway Championship in 1971 and helped Reading Racers win the British League title in 1973, but was killed after the 1973 season, in a race at the Sydney Showground.

References 

1943 births
1973 deaths
Australian speedway riders
Crewe Kings riders
Newcastle Diamonds riders
Reading Racers riders
Sportspeople from Sydney
Motorcycle racers who died while racing
Sport deaths in Australia